Coccothrinax rigida is a palm which is endemic to eastern Cuba.

Henderson and colleagues (1995) considered C. rigida to be a synonym of Coccothrinax miraguama.

References

rigida
Trees of Cuba
Plants described in 1866
Taxa named by Odoardo Beccari